Plants Plus is an Australian marketing and buying group operated on behalf of independently owned garden centres. Each member nursery pays an annual fee for membership. In return, they trade under the Plants Plus banner, sell Plants Plus branded garden products and participate in group purchasing and marketing schemes.

History 

Plants Plus was established in 1978 in Melbourne, Australia as the Retail Nurserymens' Products Co-operative Limited, which traded under The Nurserymen brand. The group's motto was "Your Plant Professionals". In September 1991, the Plants Plus brand was developed and replaced The Nurserymen. A new circular logo was devised which continued the use of a tree motif developed for The Nurserymen brand. The Plants Plus motto was "Knowledge. Advice. Quality". 

In 1995, John Danks & Son acquired the Plants Plus brand and the Retail Nurserymens Products Co-operative Limited was subsequently dissolved. By 2000, the group had expanded into all Australian states and the Australian Capital Territory.

The current pink and green logo device was developed for Plants Plus in 2002.

Publications

The Nurserymen published a 40-page monthly magazine called The Nurserymen which was issued free to customers. The magazine featured commissioned articles, product advertisements and group promotional information. In September 1991, the magazine was renamed Plants Plus (Vol. 13, No. 1) to reflect the re-branding of the group. In February 1995, the magazine became Plants Plus Garden Living (Vol. 16, No. 6). Publication of a free magazine ceased in July 1996.

Plants Plus regularly publish promotional catalogues and a subscriber-based magazine called Gardening Days.

Services
Plants Plus member nurseries stock a range of plants, gardening equipment, fertilisers and related garden products. The size of each garden centre is variable, since each is independently owned.

Plants Plus manages a loyalty scheme called the Plants Plus Loyalty Club. For an annual fee, members are sent a quarterly magazine (called Gardening Days), membership card and discount vouchers which can be redeemed at any member nursery.

There are 75 Plants Plus member nurseries across Australia.

External links
Plants Plus Website

Horticultural companies of Australia
Woolworths Group (Australia)
1978 establishments in Australia
Retail companies established in 1978
Home improvement companies of Australia
Companies based in Melbourne